J & P Coats may refer to the former names of:

 The Pawtucket Rangers
 Coats PLC